Adolfo Consolini (5 January 1917 – 20 December 1969) was an Italian discus thrower. He competed at the 1948, 1952, 1956 and 1960 Olympics and finished in 1st, 2nd, 6th and 17 place, respectively. While winning the gold medal in 1948 he set an Olympic record at 52.78 m. Consolini won three European titles, in 1946, 1950 and 1954, and 15 national titles.

Biography
Consolini was the youngest of five children in a farmer family. His first athletics competition was a local stone throwing contest in 1937. A few months later he started training in the discus; already in 1938 he finished fifth at the European championships, and in 1939 won the first of his 15 national titles. In 1941 he set a new world record at 53.34 m, which he extended to 54.23 m in 1946 and to 55.33 m in 1948.

Consolini retired from top sport after the 1960 Olympics, but continued competing at the national level until the age of 52, when he threw 43.94 m in Milan. He married Hanny Cuk, an Austrian, and had a son Sergio with her. The family settled in Milan where Consolini worked at Pirelli company the rest of his life. He died aged 52 from a viral hepatitis.

Achievements

National titles
He won fifteen times the national championships at senior level.

Italian Athletics Championships
Discus throw: 1939, 1941, 1942, 1945, 1949, 1950, 1952, 1953, 1954, 1955, 1956, 1957, 1958, 1959, 1960

See also
 Legends of Italian sport - Walk of Fame
 FIDAL Hall of Fame
 Italy national athletics team - More caps
 Italian Athletics Championships - Multi winners

References

External links
 
 

1917 births
1969 deaths
Italian male discus throwers
Olympic athletes of Italy
Olympic gold medalists for Italy
Olympic silver medalists for Italy
Athletes (track and field) at the 1948 Summer Olympics
Athletes (track and field) at the 1952 Summer Olympics
Athletes (track and field) at the 1956 Summer Olympics
Athletes (track and field) at the 1960 Summer Olympics
World record setters in athletics (track and field)
European Athletics Championships medalists
Sportspeople from the Province of Verona
Medalists at the 1952 Summer Olympics
Medalists at the 1948 Summer Olympics
Olympic gold medalists in athletics (track and field)
Olympic silver medalists in athletics (track and field)
Mediterranean Games gold medalists for Italy
Athletes (track and field) at the 1955 Mediterranean Games
Oath takers at the Olympic Games
Mediterranean Games medalists in athletics
Italian Athletics Championships winners
Deaths from hepatitis
20th-century Italian people